The manual vacuum cleaner was a type of non-electric vacuum cleaner, using suction to remove dirt from carpets, being powered by human muscle, similar in use to a manual lawn mower. Its invention is dated to the second half of the 19th century, when patents were granted to inventors in the United States, Britain, France, and elsewhere.

Mechanics
These household appliances created suction by either a pumping action, bellows, a piston being pushed up and down a tube, or had a fan driven by the wheels. Most required the efforts of two people. The models operable by one person were less efficient, but none were truly labor-saving devices or delivered the cleaning efficiency they promised. Besides hand-operated models, foot-operated models were also available, and according to a Swiss source there was even one where the operator sat in a rocking chair, rocking back and forth to produce the energy needed to create suction.

Major Models

The Baby

The Baby Daisy was a manual vacuum cleaner designed in France around 1890 but built in Britain. It required two people to operate it. The first person had to stand on the base of the bellows, moving it back and forth with the aid of a broomstick in the holder on the front.

"This movement was a key design feature as it has a double connected bellows, meaning that movement in either direction created a vacuum." The second person could use the attached hose then to clean the house. The dust was collected in a cotton bag within the machine. An example of this can be seen at the Walthamstow Pumphouse Museum

The Burger Vacuum Cleaner 
In 1898, Franz Burger of Fort Wayne, Ind. patented (#614,832 (Nov. 29, 1898) a "machine for cleaning fabrics", consisting of dual steam-powered "vacuum-chambers" (the first known use of the term "vacuum" for a cleaning device), a boxlike rectangular "extractor" with a perforated face and rollers to be pressed to the fabric, and a flexible connecting tube with a rigid tubular handle with a hand valve to turn off the suction 
when not needed; the whole unit could be mounted on a stationary base in a building or on a wheeled truck.

The Spencer Turbine Vacuum Cleaner 
In 1905, Ira Hobart Spencer (1873-1928) founded the Spencer Turbine Cleaner Co. in Hartford, Connecticut to make the Turbine Vacuum Cleaner, a stationary installed vacuum cleaning system with lightweight hoses that operates on only 5 inches of water suction, with a trademarked "sugar scoop" housing profile.

The Kendall Vacuum Cleaner 
In 1909, Oliver S. Kendall (died 1914) of Worcester, Mass. introduced the pump-type Pneu-Simplex Vacuum Cleaner, in a wooden housing.

Sears, Roebuck & Co. Manual Vacuum Cleaners 
Three different models of manual vacuum cleaners were sold by Sears, Roebuck & Co. between 1909 and 1917, the lightweight Quick and Easy, the valve-and-piston pump type Dust Killer, and the bellows-type Everybody's Vacuum Cleaner. Their main market was in rural areas, where as late as 1935, the year of passage of the Rural Electrification Act, 90% of American farms (out of 6.8 million, the peak) did not yet have electricity.

The Kotten Vacuum Cleaner
In 1910, Herman G. Kotten of Englewood, N.J. patented (#975,435, Nov. 15, 1910) the Kotten Vacuum Cleaner, which required the operator to stand on a platform and "rock from side to side like a teeter-totter, activating two bellows."

The Star Vacuum Cleaner
In 1911, the Star Vacuum Cleaner was patented in the U.K. (#18,899), consisting of a concertina-like drum that was pushed up and down the handle to suck dust through the cleaning head on top; the initial price was 54 shillings; it was discontinued in 1938.

The Golden Rod Vacuum Cleaner
In 1911, the plunger-type canister Golden Rod Vacuum Cleaner was patented (#1,012,800, Dec. 26, 1911) by Charles Boyer of Marengo, Illinois, and produced by the Hugro Manufacturing Co. of Warsaw, Indiana.

Hoover WW1 Friction Motor Vacuum Cleaner

The Hoover from WW1 (see photo) is an example for a vacuum cleaner powered by a friction motor similar to but larger than those powering toy cars. To power it the user would run it forward and back a few times, and then lower the intake to the floor and clean the floor until the motor ran down.

Production in the United States

According to Thomas' Register of American Manufacturers, sales of manual vacuum cleaners peaked in 1914. In 1914 it lists 18 manufacturers offering hand-operated vacuum cleaners, and only eight in 1916; in 1914, it lists five offering water-powered vacuum cleaners, and only two in 1916.

See also
 List of vacuum cleaners
 Vacuum cleaner

References

Collectors News, October 2006, p. 31
Giedion, S. Mechanization Takes Command.  New York: Oxford University Press, 1948.
Die Geschichte des Staubsaugers (1901–2001). < ifaar.ch/staubsauger/author> (review of  Glauser, Christoph. Einfach blitzsauber (Simply Squeaky Clean).  Zurich: Orell-Fussli Verlag, 2001)
Hoover Historical Center, 1875 East Maple Street, North Canton, OH 44720-3331

External links 
 The Vacuum Cleaner Museum
  Review Vacuum Cleaner

Vacuum cleaners
Home appliances